Lumbocostal arch can refer to:
 Medial lumbocostal arch
 Lateral lumbocostal arch